Norwich South is a constituency in Norfolk represented in the House of Commons of the Parliament of the United Kingdom, since 2015 by Clive Lewis, of the Labour Party.

History 
The constituency was created by the Representation of the People Act 1948 for the 1950 general election, when the two-seat Norwich constituency was divided into Norwich North and Norwich South. The Labour MP for this seat from 1997 to 2010 was Charles Clarke who served in the cabinet for five years from 2001 to 2006, first as Minister without Portfolio, then as Secretary of State for Education and Skills and latterly as Home Secretary.

Norwich South was Labour's safest seat in Norfolk until 2005. Although it was lost to the Conservatives in 1983, it was regained by Labour in 1987 and was the only Labour seat in Norfolk until 1997. In 2005 the Labour majority was cut by over 5000, leaving Norwich North as the safest Labour seat in the county.

At the 2010 election, the seat was considered a three-way marginal between the incumbent Labour party, the Liberal Democrats and the Conservatives. The seat was also targeted by the Green Party. The Liberal Democrats won the seat, with the lowest percentage share of the vote in a constituency in the 2010 election. The loss was considered an embarrassment for the Labour Party as it was the seat of a former Home Secretary.

In the 2015 election, Norwich South was the Green Party's number one target seat, and due to the tiny majority of just 310 votes for the Liberal Democrat Simon Wright over Labour in the previous election, it was a key Labour target. In the event, Wright came fourth with under half his 2010 vote, behind the Greens, Conservatives and Labour, whose left-wing candidate Clive Lewis won the seat with a 10.6% swing from the Liberal Democrats to Labour. The Green Party share of the vote actually fell by 1% compared to 2010, with the Conservative vote slightly increasing.

In the 2017 election, UKIP did not contest the seat but endorsed the Conservatives. Clive Lewis increased Labour's vote share by 22 percentage points to win 31,311 votes (61.0%), the most votes any party has ever won in the constituency. This happened despite the Conservative share of the vote also increasing by 7.1%. The swing was entirely from the Liberal Democrats (who had held the seat from 2010 to 2015) whose vote fell to 5.5%, and the Green Party (who had made the seat a top target in 2015) who dropped to 2.9%, their worst result in Norwich South since 1997.

Boundaries and boundary changes

1950–1974: The County Borough of Norwich wards of Ber Street, Conesford, Earlham, Eaton, Lakenham, Nelson, St Stephen, and Town Close.

1974–1983: The County Borough of Norwich wards of Bowthorpe, Earlham, Eaton, Lakenham, Nelson, St Stephen, Town Close, and University.

Further to the Second Periodic Review of Parliamentary Constituencies a redistribution of seats was enacted in 1970. However, in the case of the two Norwich constituencies, this was superseded before the February 1974 general election by the Parliamentary Constituencies (Norwich) Order 1973 which followed on from a revision of the County Borough of Norwich wards in 1971, resulting in a realignment of the boundary with Norwich North.

1983–1997: The City of Norwich wards of Bowthorpe, Eaton, Heigham, Henderson, Lakenham, Mancroft, Nelson, St Stephen, Thorpe Hamlet, Town Close, and University.

Extended northwards, gaining southern parts of Norwich North.

1997–2010: The City of Norwich wards of Bowthorpe, Eaton, Heigham, Henderson, Lakenham, Mancroft, Nelson, St Stephen, Thorpe Hamlet, Town Close, and University, and the District of South Norfolk wards of Cringleford and Colney, and New Costessey.

The two District of South Norfolk wards were transferred from the constituency of South Norfolk.

2010–present: The City of Norwich wards of Bowthorpe, Eaton, Lakenham, Mancroft, Nelson, Thorpe Hamlet, Town Close, university, and Wensum, and the District of South Norfolk ward of New Costessey.

Following their review of parliamentary constituencies in Norfolk that concluded in 2004 and came into effect for the 2010 general election, the Boundary Commission for England created a slightly modified Norwich South constituency. The part of the Crome ward around Morse Road became part of Norwich North, while the area around Mousehold Street in Thorpe Hamlet moved to Norwich South. The villages of Cringleford and Colney were lost to the South Norfolk constituency.

The changes were necessary to re-align the constituency boundaries with the new local government ward boundaries introduced in South Norfolk and Norwich in 2003 and 2004 respectively and to take account of Norfolk being awarded an additional, ninth constituency by the Boundary Commission.

Members of Parliament

Elections

Elections in the 2010s

*NB boundary changes occurred between 2005 and 2010.

Elections in the 2000s

Elections in the 1990s

Elections in the 1980s

Elections in the 1970s

Elections in the 1960s

Elections in the 1950s

See also
 List of parliamentary constituencies in Norfolk
 Opinion polling for the next United Kingdom general election in individual constituencies

Notes

References

Constituencies of the Parliament of the United Kingdom established in 1950
Parliamentary constituencies in Norfolk
Politics of Norwich